Wattakaka is a small genus of flowering plants in the family Apocynaceae, native to from south China through tropical Asia. The genus was established by Justus Carl Hasskarl in 1857. It is placed in subfamily Asclepiadoideae, tribe Marsdenieae.

Species
, Plants of the World Online accepted two species:
Wattakaka lanceolata (T.Cooke) Kerr
Wattakaka volubilis (L.f.) Stapf

References

Asclepiadoideae
Apocynaceae genera